James G. Manger (born 10 January 1958) is a former English cricketer.  Manger was a right-handed batsman who bowled right-arm medium pace.  He was born in Headington, Oxfordshire.

Manger made his debut for Oxfordshire in the 1977 Minor Counties Championship against Wiltshire.  Manger played Minor counties cricket for Oxfordshire from 1977 to 1984, which included 24 Minor Counties Championship matches and 4 MCCA Knockout Trophy matches.  He made his List A debut against Warwickshire in the 1984 NatWest Trophy.  He played a further List A match the following season against the same opposition in the 1985 NatWest Trophy.  In his 2 List A matches he scored 26 runs at a batting average of 13.00, with a high score of 17.

References

External links
James Manger at ESPNcricinfo
James Manger at CricketArchive

1958 births
Living people
Cricketers from Oxford
English cricketers
Oxfordshire cricketers